The 1970 Nevada gubernatorial election occurred on November 3, 1970. Incumbent Republican Paul Laxalt did not run for re-election to a second term as Governor of Nevada. Democratic nominee Mike O'Callaghan defeated Republican nominee Ed Fike to succeed him.

Results

References

1970
Nevada
Gubernatorial
November 1970 events in the United States